Jean-Christophe Koffi (born 5 January 1998) is an Ivorian professional footballer who plays as a midfielder.

Early life
Koffi was born in Abidjan, Ivory Coast and moved to the United States in 2009. He spent four years in the D.C. United academy from 2011 to 2015, before attending the University of Virginia.

Club career

New York Red Bulls
On 7 September 2018 it was announced that Koffi signed with the New York Red Bulls, and that he would officially join the club on 1 January 2019. On 9 March 2019 Koffi made his professional debut with New York Red Bulls II in a 3–1 victory over Swope Park Rangers.

Sète
On 3 November 2021, he signed with Sète in the French third-tier Championnat National.

Loudoun United
On 11 August 2022, Koffi returned to the United States, joining USL Championship side Loudoun United.

Career statistics

References

External links
 

1998 births
People from Potomac, Maryland
Sportspeople from Montgomery County, Maryland
Soccer players from Maryland
Living people
Ivorian footballers
Association football midfielders
Virginia Cavaliers men's soccer players
New York Red Bulls players
New York Red Bulls II players
Memphis 901 FC players
FC Sète 34 players
Loudoun United FC players
USL Championship players
Championnat National players
Ivorian expatriate footballers
Expatriate footballers in France
Ivorian expatriate sportspeople in France
Homegrown Players (MLS)